Leonard Stephen Thompson (born January 1, 1947) is an American professional golfer who has played on the PGA Tour, Nationwide Tour and Champions Tour.

Thompson was born in Laurinburg, North Carolina. He attended Wake Forest University in Winston-Salem, North Carolina and was a member of the golf team. He was a teammate of future fellow PGA Tour players Joe Inman and Lanny Wadkins. He graduated in 1969 and turned pro in 1971.

Thompson had more than 70 top-10 finishes in PGA Tour events during his career, winning 3 times. His first win came in 1974 at Jackie Gleason's Inverrary Classic. His best finish in a major championship was T7 at The Masters in 1979.

During his late forties, Thompson, like so many of his colleagues, played some on the Nationwide Tour to prepare for the Champions Tour. His best finish in that venue was a 6th at the 1996 NIKE Tallahassee Open.

After turning 50 at the beginning of 1997, Thompson began play on the Senior PGA Tour (now known as the Champions Tour). He has three wins on this Tour. He played in his milestone 1000th PGA Tour and Champions Tour event combined at the 2009 SAS Championship.

Thompson was inducted into the Wake Forest University Athletics Hall of Fame in 1997. He lives in Ponte Vedra Beach, Florida.

Amateur wins (1)
1969 Sunnehanna Amateur

Professional wins (8)

PGA Tour wins (3)

Other wins (2)
this list may be incomplete
1975 Carolinas Open
1985 Carolinas PGA Championship

Senior PGA Tour wins (3)

Senior PGA Tour playoff record (2–0)

Results in major championships

Note: Thompson never played in The Open Championship

CUT = missed the half-way cut
"T" indicates a tie for a place

See also
1971 PGA Tour Qualifying School graduates
1987 PGA Tour Qualifying School graduates

References

External links

American male golfers
Wake Forest Demon Deacons men's golfers
PGA Tour golfers
PGA Tour Champions golfers
Golfers from North Carolina
Golfers from Florida
People from Laurinburg, North Carolina
People from Ponte Vedra Beach, Florida
1947 births
Living people